Theodore Roosevelt High School is a public high school located in Sioux Falls, South Dakota, United States. It opened in 1991 and is one of four traditional high schools in the Sioux Falls School District.

History
Roosevelt was the third high school in the Sioux Falls School District. The school opened for the 1991–1992 school year after a $17 million construction effort. Eventual overcrowding at the school was used as a pitching point for the referendum that later funded Jefferson High School.

Athletics
Roosevelt athletic teams are nicknamed the Rough Riders and compete in the Metro Athletic Conference.
The 2021-22 boys basketball team achieved a perfect 22-0 season en route to their a back to back state championship.

Performing arts
RHS has three competitive show choirs: the mixed-gender "Executive Suite" and "Rider Revolution" as well as the all-female "Capitol Harmony". The school also fields the only competitive inclusive show choir in the United States, "Unity, Inc." The program also hosts an annual competition.

Notable alumni
 Kellen Briggs, hockey player
 Joe Krabbenhoft, basketball coach
 January Jones, actress in the television series Mad Men

References

Public high schools in South Dakota
Education in Sioux Falls, South Dakota
Buildings and structures in Sioux Falls, South Dakota
Schools in Minnehaha County, South Dakota
1991 establishments in South Dakota
Educational institutions established in 1991